Eduardo Guillermo Bonvallet Godoy (13 January 1955 – 18 September 2015) was a Chilean footballer who played as a defensive midfielder and later developed a sportscasting career.

He was best known for his strong and rather harsh commentaries on Chilean football players, coaches and managerial structures. Bonvallet had put himself forward repeatedly for the position of coach for the national team. Bonvallet had experience training university-level teams, such as Universidad Gabriela Mistral.

Playing career

Club
He played for local giants Universidad de Chile and Universidad Católica and had spells in the NASL with Tampa Bay Rowdies and Fort Lauderdale Strikers.

International
Bonvallet made his international debut in 1979, earning a total of 24 caps, but no scoring. He represented his country in one FIFA World Cup qualification match and played in three games at the 1982 FIFA World Cup.

Managerial career
In 2007, Bonvallet was appointed manager of Deportivo Temuco (owned by Nehuen S.A.). The club was in difficulties, losing many games before Bonvallet took charge. This was his first chance to manage a professional team in the second division but success eluded him, Temuco being relegated to the Chilean third division.

In 2010, he assumed as coach of Sportverein Jugendland Fussball from Peñaflor in the Chilean Tercera B, with Kormac Valdebenito as the Sport Manager.

Media career
Bonvallet had also coined a lot of insulting words and phrases in Chilean Spanish, which became popular on his show TVO Channel thanks to the involuntary aid of another one, Caiga Quién Caiga. Some of his notorious phrases were:
¡Avíspate re-huevón! (React, dumbass!)
¡Desconchetumadrízate! (Un-motherfucker-ize yourself!)
¡Ahuevonado al máximo! (Dumbass to the max!)
¡Feo, mamón y no sabís nada! (Ugly! Pussy! And you don't know anything!)
¡Grita huevón, grita! (Scream idiot! Scream!)
¡O eres monje, fakir o guerrero, o sencillamente te pierdes! (You must be either a monk, a fakir or a warrior or you will simply get confused!)
¡Tienen que comer carne! (They have to eat meat!)

He was on trial several times for publicly insulting managers, politicians, businessmen, etc. During his last years he earned considerable support, proclaiming himself "El gurú" ("The Guru").

Titles

Personal life and death
His son, played football at professional level as a midfielder for both Santiago Wanderers and Unión San Felipe and has continued on a career in the media and social networks like his father. His daughter, Daniela, is a journalist who was an elected member for the municipal council of Ñuñoa, Santiago, in 2021.

In June 2008, it was reported that there was a physical altercation between Bonvallet and former Chilean footballer Carlos Caszely. The location was a Santiago, Chile ice cream shop located in the commune of Las Condes. Witnesses reported that there was a fist fight after the two had an exchange of words.

In 2011, Bonvallet was diagnosed with stomach cancer. However, in late 2012 he announced he had beaten the illness but was required to undergo chemotherapy for at least another year.

On 18 September 2015, Bonvallet was found dead by hanging using a belt at Nogales Hotel in the kitchen of room 213. Local news report he was suffering from depression.

References

External links

1955 births
2015 suicides
Chilean people of French descent
Footballers from Santiago
Chilean footballers
Chilean expatriate footballers
Universidad de Chile footballers
Club Deportivo Universidad Católica footballers
O'Higgins F.C. footballers
Fort Lauderdale Strikers (1977–1983) players
Tampa Bay Rowdies (1975–1993) players
Unión San Felipe footballers
Chilean Primera División players
North American Soccer League (1968–1984) players
Chile international footballers
1982 FIFA World Cup players
1979 Copa América players
Chilean expatriate sportspeople in the United States
Expatriate soccer players in the United States
Association football midfielders
Chilean football managers
Deportes Temuco managers
Primera B de Chile managers
Chilean television personalities
Chilean television presenters
Chilean association football commentators
La Red (Chilean TV channel) color commentators
Suicides by hanging in Chile